This is a list of notable alumni, faculty, and students, from Waseda University. Those individuals who qualify for multiple categories have been placed under the section for which they are best known.

Prime ministers
 Tanzan Ishibashi (1956–1957)
 Noboru Takeshita (1987–1989)
 Toshiki Kaifu (1989–1991)
 Keizō Obuchi (1998–2000)
 Mikio Aoki (Acting: 2000-2000)
 Yoshirō Mori (2000–2001)
 Yasuo Fukuda (2007–2008)
 Yoshihiko Noda (2011–2012)
 Fumio Kishida (2021- present)

Politics

Diplomats
 Chiune Sugihara
 Tsuneo Koizumi
 Katsuhiko Oku – rugby player and diplomat, promoted posthumously to ambassador

Business leaders

Academics

Authors

Journalists
 Soichiro Tawara
 Yoh Henmi
 Satoshi Kamata
 Chang Deok-soo

Performing arts

 Jerome Polin  -YouTubers

Scientists
 Shingo Futamura - rubber industry scientist

Sports

Baseball

Figure skating
 Shizuka Arakawa – 2006 Winter Olympics gold medalist
 Rena Inoue – Pairs skater
 Yukari Nakano
 Fumie Suguri
 Yuzuru Hanyu – Men's singles figure skater, 2014, 2018 Winter Olympics gold medalist and two-times world champion

Football
 Kunishige Kamamoto
 Saburo Kawabuchi – ex-President of Japan football association and ex-Chairman of Japan professional soccer league

Martial arts

Rugby
 Katsuyuki Kiyomiya – player and coach
 Hiroaki Shukuzawa – player and coach
 Ayumu Goromaru
 Yoshikazu Fujita

Swimming

Volleyball 
 Yoko Zetterlund – Former player of https://en.wikipedia.org/wiki/United_States_women%27s_national_volleyball_team
 Ryuta Homma – Former roster of men's national volleyball team and currently active in V.League Division 1
 Taichi Fukuyama – Current roster of men's national volleyball team
 Yuto Fujinaka – Former roster of Japan U-21 and U-23 national volleyball team and currently active in V.League Division 1
 Mitsuki Kobayashi – Former roster of Japan U-21 and universiade national team, competing in 2019 Summer Universiade. Currently active in V.League Division 1
 Kento Miyaura – Current roster of men's national volleyball team
 Otsuka Tatsunori – Current roster of men's national volleyball team

Miscellaneous

Other

Notable current students

Sports
 Tatsuki Machida – Figure skater
 Shingo Nishiyama – Figure skater
 Rika Kihira – Figure skater
 Miyabi Onitsuka – Snowboarder
 Kanako Watanabe – Swimmer
 Ippei Watanabe – Swimmer
 Tatsunori Otsuka – Men's national volleyball player, being a part of 2020 Olympics men's tournament

Performing arts
 Jyongri – singer
 Natsuki Sato – idol singer, former member of AKB48
 Yui Ogura – voice actor, roles include Toki Onjōji (Saki Achiga-hen Episode of Side-A)

Notable faculty members

Principals, de facto presidents (1907–1923), and presidents

Principals 
 Hidemaro Ōkuma, 1882–1886
 Hisoka Maejima, 1886–1890
 Kazuo Hatoyama, 1890–1907

De facto presidents (1907–1923) 
 Sanae Takata, 1907–1915
 Tameyuki Amano, 1915–1917
 Yoshiro Hiranuma, 1918–1921
 Masasada Shiozawa, 1921–1923

Presidents

Trustees 
 Ryuhoku Narushima, poet, journalist, and one of the first trustees of Waseda
 Azusa Ono (1852–1886), law scholar and one of the first trustees of Waseda

Benefactors 
Waseda University has had numerous benefactors, including:

References

External links
 Waseda University Alumni Association (WUAA) website

Lists of people by university or college in Japan
Tokyo-related lists